The Asian Tour 2015/2016 – Event 1 (also known as the 2015 Haining Open) was a professional minor-ranking snooker tournament that took place between 19 and 23 October 2015 in Haining, China.

Stuart Bingham was the defending champion, but chose not to defend his title; Ding Junhui won the title for the first time, beating Ricky Walden 4–3 in the final.

Prize fund
The breakdown of prize money of the event is shown below:

Main draw

Round 1
Best of 7 frames

Top half

Section 1

Section 2

Section 3

Section 4

Bottom half

Section 5

Section 6

Section 7

Section 8

Finals

Century breaks 

135, 127, 122  Tian Pengfei
135  Liang Wenbo
130, 123, 121, 102, 100  Ding Junhui
128  Jimmy Robertson
122  Lyu Haotian
121  Wang Yuchen
119, 117, 108  Marco Fu

115, 100  Ricky Walden
110  James Wattana
106  John Higgins
106  Ding Kai
105  Zhang Anda
101  Hu Hao
100  Robert Milkins

References

Haining Open
AT1
2015 in Chinese sport
Sport in Zhejiang